Rangthangling Gewog (Dzongkha: རང་ཐང་གླིང་) is a gewog (village block) of Tsirang District, Bhutan.

References

Gewogs of Bhutan
Tsirang District